Stanley Obodiac (February 7, 1922 – November 3, 1984) was a Canadian ice hockey player with the Lethbridge Maple Leafs. He won a gold medal at the 1951 World Ice Hockey Championships in Paris, France. The 1951 Lethbridge Maple Leafs team was inducted to the Alberta Sports Hall of Fame in 1974. He was the leading scorer of the 1951 World Championship tournament.

Following his career as a hockey player, he remained employed in hockey as public relations director for the Toronto Maple Leafs and Maple Leaf Gardens. In this capacity, he wrote and published the history book The Leafs: The First 50 Years, which was a finalist for the Toronto Book Awards in 1977.

References

1922 births
1984 deaths
Canadian ice hockey left wingers
Sportspeople from Moose Jaw
Ice hockey people from Saskatchewan
Canadian sportswriters
20th-century Canadian non-fiction writers
20th-century Canadian male writers